Muhoroni Youth Football Club is a football club from Muhoroni, Kenya, but plays its home matches at the Nyayo National Stadium in Nairobi. They currently compete in the Kenyan Premier League, where they were promoted after winning the 2011 season of the defunct KFF Nationwide League.
Muhoroni youth won the top 8 cup in 2016.

Old squad (2012)

Source:

Current coaching staff
Head coach                       gilbert selebwa
Assistant head coach        James omondi
Team Manager                   mike odongo
Assistant team manager    Elly Onyuka
Physiotherapist                  Deus Mkabwa
 date=January 2017}}

External links
http://www.soka.co.ke/tag/muhoroni_youth

References

Kenyan Premier League clubs
Football clubs in Kenya
Sport in Nairobi
Sport in Nyanza Province
2003 establishments in Kenya